Kleinia madagascariensis is a species of flowering plant in the genus Kleinia and the family Asteraceae and is endemic to Madagascar.

References

External links

madagascariensis
Endemic flora of Madagascar
Plants described in 1923
Taxa named by Jean-Henri Humbert